Schlitters is a municipality in the Schwaz district in the Austrian state of Tyrol.

Geography
Schlitters lies in the Ziller Valley.

References

Cities and towns in Schwaz District